The Daniel Carter Beard Bridge (also known colloquially as the Big Mac Bridge),  is a yellow twin span steel bowstring arch bridge crossing the Ohio River in Cincinnati, Ohio. It carries Interstate 471 between Cincinnati, Ohio, and Newport, Kentucky. As to the origin of this nickname, its yellow arches are said to be similar to the "Golden Arches" logo of McDonald's restaurant. The nickname was coined by local residents after the bridge's golden arches were constructed. In the 1980s, McDonald's considered opening a floating restaurant at the base after the nickname caught on, but never went to construction. It is named in honor of Daniel Carter Beard, the founder of the Sons of Daniel Boone and one of the founders of the Boy Scouts of America.

The bridge was originally designed by Hazelet + Erdal, now URS Corporation.

The bridge was originally configured with three lanes and an emergency shoulder on each span. In December 2000, with the completion of a reconstruction project on the 3rd Street Viaduct approach, the bridge was reconfigured to four lanes on each span.

See also
 
 
 
 
 List of crossings of the Ohio River
 List of longest arch bridge spans

References

External links
 Daniel Carter Beard Bridge at Bridges & Tunnels
 Daniel Carter Beard Bridge at Cincinnati Transit
 

Beard
Bridges completed in 1976
Newport, Kentucky
Bridges over the Ohio River
Tied arch bridges in the United States
Road bridges in Kentucky
Road bridges in Ohio
Buildings and structures in Campbell County, Kentucky
Interstate 71
1976 establishments in Kentucky
Bridges on the Interstate Highway System
1976 establishments in Ohio
Steel bridges in the United States
Transportation in Campbell County, Kentucky